The Villanova Wildcats men's basketball program represent Villanova University in men's college basketball and competes in the Big East Conference of NCAA Division I. Their first season was the 1920–21 season. Named the Wildcats, Villanova is a member of the Philadelphia Big Five, five Philadelphia college basketball teams who share a passionate rivalry.

The Wildcats have won the National Championship three times: 1985, 2016, and 2018. Their 1985 NCAA championship victory as an 8 seed still stands as the lowest seed ever to win the title. The championship game of that year is referred to as "The Perfect Game" as they shot a championship game record 78.6% as a team for the game (22 for 28, including 9 for 10 in the second half). Their 2016 NCAA Championship is referred to as "The Perfect Ending" and became the second of only two NCAA Men's Championship games to be won on a buzzer beater when Kris Jenkins drained a shot as time expired. Their most recent national championship victory in 2018 was the culmination of a season many believe to be one of, if not, the greatest college basketball season for a team of all time. They made the Final Four in 1939, 1971, 1985, 2009, 2016, 2018, and 2022; their six Final Four appearances are 13th most all-time. As of 2019, they have an NCAA Tournament record of 65–37. Villanova has defeated six No. 1 seeds in the NCAA tournament (Michigan and Georgetown in 1985, Pittsburgh in 2009, Kansas and North Carolina in 2016, and Kansas in 2018), which is sixth most all-time. The Villanova Wildcats have appeared in the NCAA tournament 39 times, the eighth highest total in NCAA history. They have won the Big East regular season championship eight times, most recently winning four straight from 2014 to 2017. They won the Big East tournament in 1995, 2015, 2017, 2018, 2019 and 2022. Through 2021, Villanova has 1,817 wins, which is 19th among Division I men's basketball teams and is tied for 9th in all time winning percentage at (.657). Villanova has won the Philadelphia Big Five 27 times, and is tied with Temple University for the most of any team, including five straight from 2014 to 2018. The Wildcats have appeared in the National Invitation Tournament 18 times, winning in 1994.

By the numbers

 NCAA national championships – 3 
 NCAA Championship Game appearances – 4
 NCAA Final Four – 6
 NCAA Elite Eight – 14
 NCAA Sweet Sixteen – 18
 NCAA Tournament Appearances – 39
 National Coach of the Year – 2
 Conference regular season Championships – 12
 All-Americans – 20 
 Weeks Ranked as AP #1 Team – 19
 30-Win Seasons – 5
 Philadelphia Big 5 Championships – 25
 Philadelphia Big 5 Player of the Year – 20
 Winning Seasons – 78

History

Early years (1920–1936)
Villanova began its varsity basketball program in 1920. Michael Saxe coached for six seasons, from 1920 to 1926, compiling a 64–30 record (.681). John Cashman coached three seasons, from 1926 to 1929, compiling a 21–26 record (.447). George "Doc" Jacobs coached seven seasons, from 1929 to 1936, and had a 62–56 record (.525).

The team played its first game in 1920 in Alumni Hall on Villanova's campus, beating Catholic University 43–40.  In the early years, Villanova's home courts were Alumni Hall and West Catholic High School.  In 1932, The Wildcats moved into the Villanova Field House—now known as the Jake Nevin Field House, which was named after Villanova's long-time trainer.  Villanova also played many home games at the Palestra on the campus of the University of Pennsylvania beginning in 1929. The Wildcats played home games in both the Villanova Field House and the Palestra until 1986.

Al Severance era (1936–1961)
Al Severance coached Villanova for 25 seasons, from 1936 to 1961.  It was under Severance's leadership that Villanova's basketball program rose to prominence.  Severance compiled a 413–201 record (.673).

The 1938–39 team won the first-ever NCAA Tournament game, which put them in the inaugural Final Four.  Severance led the Wildcats to the NCAA tournament again in 1949, 1951, and 1955.  Villanova earned NIT bids in 1959 and 1960.

The most storied player in Villanova history, Paul Arizin, played during this era.  Severance discovered Arizin, already a Villanova student, playing basketball in the Villanova Fieldhouse.  Arizin holds the Villanova record for most points in a game (85), and is credited with inventing the jump shot and was the 1949 College Player of the Year.
Other notable players from the Severance era include Joe Lord, Larry Hennessy, Bob Schafer and George Raveling.

Coincidentally, Severance died on April 1, 1985, which was the same day that Villanova upset Georgetown University and Patrick Ewing to take the NCAA basketball championship.

1939 Final Four
The inaugural NCAA tournament featured eight teams from throughout the country.  Villanova, representing the Middle Atlantic States, beat Brown, representative of the New England States, 43–40 before a crowd of 3,500 at the Palestra.  The following night, the Wildcats lost to Ohio State 53–36 in the Eastern Division Championship.

Jack Kraft era (1961–1973)
Jack Kraft coached Villanova for 12 years, from 1961 through 1973.  He compiled a 238–95 record (.715).  Kraft led Villanova to the NCAA tournament six times, and five times to the NIT.  Only once did Kraft's teams fail to earn a post-season bid, in his final season.

Notable players during the Jack Kraft era include: Chris Ford, Tom Ingelsby, Wali Jones, Bill Melchionni, Howard Porter, Jim Washington, and Hubie White.

1971 NCAA Finalist
On March 27, 1971, Villanova made its first appearance in an NCAA basketball tournament championship game.  The unheralded Wildcats took on the legendary John Wooden and his mighty UCLA Bruins.  The 28–1 UCLA squad featured Sidney Wicks, Curtis Rowe, Henry Bibby, and Steve Patterson.  Going into the title game, the Bruins had won six of the previous seven NCAA championships, including the previous four.

Jack Kraft's Villanova squad, nicknamed the "Iron Men", was made up of just nine players.  Led by Howard Porter, Clarence Smith, Hank Siemiontkowski, Chris Ford, Tom Ingelsby, Bob Gohl, Mike Daley, John Fox and Joe McDowell. Villanova amassed a 27–6 record, including a shocking 90–47 victory over a previously undefeated powerhouse Penn squad.

Villanova fought from behind for most of the game, twice cutting the lead to three in the final minutes.  Villanova lost by six, 68–62.  Up to that time, the six-point loss was the narrowest spread of UCLA's six NCAA title game victories.

Despite the loss, Villanova's Howard Porter was named the Tournament's Most Outstanding Player. Porter was later stripped of the award and the team's NCAA victories were vacated after it was discovered that Porter had violated NCAA rules because he had signed a professional contract with the Pittsburgh Condors of the American Basketball Association during the middle of his senior year.

Rollie Massimino era (1973–1992)
During Rollie Massimino's tenure, the Villanova Wildcats abandoned their traditional independent status by joining the newly formed Eastern Eight Conference in 1975.  In 1980, the 'Cats moved into the new Big East Conference, along with Georgetown, St. John's, and Syracuse.  The 1980s were the golden age of the Big East, highlighted by the 1985 NCAA tournament, when Villanova, Georgetown, and St. John's reached the Final Four.

Massimino's teams had tremendous success in the NCAA tournament, usually in an underdog role.  Coach Massimino led the Wildcats to the NCAA tournament eleven times, winning in 1985.  His teams reached the Elite Eight five times in an 11-year span: 1978, 1982, 1983, 1985, and 1988.  Coach Massimino's teams were well-prepared for the Tournament, always playing a difficult schedule, and playing tenacious defense.  Massimino lost their opening game in the NCAA tournament only once, to Shaquille O'Neal and Chris Jackson-led LSU in 1990 and he remarkably never lost to a lower seeded team.

Massimino coached for 19 seasons at Villanova, compiling a record of 357–241 (.596).  In the NCAA tournament, Massimino had a 20–10 record (.667).

Notable players from the Massimino era include Alex Bradley, Stewart Granger, Keith Herron, Dwayne McClain, Harold Jensen, Ed Pinckney, John Pinone, Harold Pressley, Rory Sparrow, and Doug West.

In 1976, the Wildcats played their first game in the Spectrum in Philadelphia.  Because of the greater seating capacity, the 'Cats generally played a few home games each year at the Spectrum until the opening of what is now known as the Wells Fargo Center.  Villanova christened its current home court as John Eleuthère du Pont Pavilion, now the Pavilion, with a 64–62 victory over Len Bias led Maryland squad on February 1, 1986.

1985 National Champions

In 1985, under the direction of coach Rollie Massimino, the men's basketball team completed one of the most surprising runs in NCAA tournament history by winning the national championship in the first year of the 64-team field. The eighth-seeded Wildcats (unranked in the final AP poll) beat Dayton (at Dayton), top-seeded Michigan, Maryland and second-seeded North Carolina to win the Southeast Regional en route to the Final Four in Lexington, Kentucky. After defeating 2-seed Memphis State in the national semifinals, Villanova met defending champion and ten-point-favorite Georgetown, led by Patrick Ewing, in the title game on April Fools' Day.

Top-seeded Georgetown had beaten conference rival Villanova twice during the regular season, and had reached the title game with tenacious defense, which gave up less than 40% of their opponents' shots from the field in both the regular season and the postseason. Before the championship game, Massimino told his team they had to play a perfect game in order to beat Georgetown.  In perhaps the greatest shooting performance in NCAA history, the Wildcats went 22-of-28 from the field to convert a blistering 78.6% of their shots, including a second half where they missed only one basket. The Hoyas hung tough, converting 55% of their 53 attempts, but were unable to overcome the astounding shooting performance as Villanova won 66–64 to claim the NCAA championship. The Wildcat squad remains the only eight-seed and the lowest overall seed in tournament history to win the championship, and their overall team shooting percentage remains an NCAA tournament record for a single game. The game is often cited among the greatest upsets in college basketball history. Ed Pinckney, who shot 5-of-7 and had 16 points in the game, was named the tournament's Most Outstanding Player. This game is featured in the book The Perfect Game by Frank Fitzpatrick.

Steve Lappas era (1992–2001)
Lappas compiled a very respectable record of 174–110 (.613) during his years at Villanova.  The 1994 and 1995 teams, led by Kerry Kittles, Jason Lawson, Eric Eberz, and Alvin Williams, won the NIT and Big East tournaments, respectively.  The 1995 Big East tournament title was capped by a decisive victory over a Connecticut team that had been ranked Number 1 during the regular season before being defeated on the Huskies home court by Villanova. This represents the one and only time Villanova won the original Big East tournament before the Conference was reconfigured in 2013. However, five nights after their victory in the 1995 Big East Championship, the Wildcats lost a triple-overtime thriller to underdog Old Dominion on St. Patrick's Night in Albany, New York in a 1st round NCAA game many Villanova fans consider the most painful loss in Villanova history.

Under Coach Lappas, Villanova reached the NCAA tournament in 1995, 1996, 1997, and 1999, compiling a disappointing 2–4 record and never advancing beyond the second round. After a 2001 First round NIT loss at Minnesota, junior center Michael Bradley announced he was forgoing his final year of eligibility to enter the NBA draft, essentially leaving Villanova without a returning star player. Shortly thereafter, Hofstra coach and former Massimino assistant Jay Wright became available, and the Administration decided a coaching change would benefit all parties. Lappas left Villanova to pursue other opportunities, ultimately becoming a respected television analyst for CBS coverage of NCAA basketball, and has been welcomed back with open arms to the Villanova basketball family.

Notable players in the Lappas era include Michael Bradley, Kerry Kittles, Jason Lawson, Tim Thomas, John Celestand and Alvin Williams and Eric Eberz.

During the Lappas-era, Villanova began playing a few major home games at the Wells Fargo Center beginning in 1996.  Villanova's first game in the new arena was a December 1996 loss to the Duke Blue Devils. Wells Fargo Center was known as the CoreStates Center, the First Union Center, and the Wachovia Center before it adopted the Wells Fargo Center name.

Jay Wright era (2001–2022)
Jay Wright was named Villanova's head coach in 2001.  As Rollie Massimino's assistant from 1987 through 1992, he was well-acquainted with Villanova.  Prior to his hiring by Villanova, Wright was head coach at Hofstra. 
 
Villanova earned a post-season tournament berth in each of Wright's initial ten seasons as Villanova head coach before missing in 2011–12.  The Wildcats played in the NIT in 2002, 2003, and 2004, and in 14 of 15 NCAA Tournaments since 2005. Wright's Villanova teams have reached 6 Regionals, 4 Final Fours and have won 2 National Championships. During Wright's tenure, Villanova has compiled a 34–13 record in the NCAA tournament, crowned with the 2016 and 2018 National Championships.  Six of Wright's NCAA Tournament losses at Villanova have been to the eventual National Champion.
One of the highlights of his tenure was an amazing run to the 2009 Final Four when Villanova beat #1 seeded Pittsburgh to win the Elite 8 on a coast-to-coast buzzer beating layup by team captain Scottie Reynolds.  Villanova subsequently lost the national semifinals to eventual NCAA Champion North Carolina.

Strong starts to the 2009–10 and 2010–11 seasons were followed by struggling finishes. Villanova barely beat Robert Morris in overtime before taking losses at the hands of St Mary's (2010) and George Mason (2011) in NCAA Tournament play. Villanova had a rebuilding 2011–12 season, compiling a 13–19 record and missing a post-season bid for the only time in Wright's tenure.

A young nucleus in 2012–13 was a portent of future glory and saw the Wildcats make a return trip to the 2013 NCAA tournament where they fell to once-and-future foe North Carolina. Still, a #2 seed in 2013–14 and a #1 seed in 2014–15 preceded second round NCAA exits at the hands of UCONN (2014) and N.C. State(2015) causing Nova Nation some well-publicized consternation. The 2016 and 2018 Championship runs put the "underachiever" tag to the sword, cementing Wright's Villanova legacy as the program's greatest mentor. The 2016 National Championship victory was accomplished on the strength of Kris Jenkin's NBA-range 3 point buzzer bomb, thwarting North Carolina. The 2018 Championship win over Michigan culminated a six-game NCAA tournament run in which no opponent finished within a dozen points of the Wildcats.

Notable players during the Jay Wright era include Randy Foye, Kyle Lowry, Dante Cunningham, Allan Ray, Mike Nardi, Will Sheridan, Curtis Sumpter, Scottie Reynolds, Corey Fisher, JayVaughn Pinkston, Darrun Hilliard, 2016 champions including Final Four most outstanding player Ryan Arcidiacono, Daniel Ochefu, Kris Jenkins and Josh Hart. Four Villanova players from the 2018 championship team were drafted by the NBA—national player of the year and Final Four most outstanding player Jalen Brunson, Mikal Bridges, Donte Divincenzo and Omari Spellman. National title holdovers Phil Booth and Eric Paschall keyed Villanova' surprising run to the 2019 Big East Regular Season and tournament championships. In the 2019 NCAA Tournament, six seed Villanova gained a measure of revenge against St. Mary's with a first-round victory followed by a loss to Purdue, a strong 3 seed, in the second round. Booth ended his Villanova career as the all-time winningest player in program history with 2 national titles and 4 Big East tournament championships (2015, 2017, 2018, and 2019).

2004–05 season
Under coach Jay Wright, Villanova's men's basketball team reached the 2005 NCAA Tournament Sweet 16, defeating New Mexico and Florida before losing to #1 seed and eventual champion North Carolina by one point. Junior Forward Curtis Sumpter was injured in the Florida game and did not return to the court until the 2006–07 season. There is controversy surrounding a disputed traveling call against Allan Ray made in the closing seconds of the UNC game. With under a minute left and Villanova down by three, Ray drove and made a shot. There was contact with a UNC defender and a whistle. Most assumed the whistle signified a foul on Carolina, giving Ray a chance to tie the game with the resultant free-throw. Incredibly, the officials ruled that Ray committed a traveling violation prior to taking the shot, negating the basket, and rendering Kyle Lowry's buzzer beating 3 pointer a mere footnote to a painful loss. In an ironic twist of fate, Booth, late in the 2016 National Championship game (also against North Carolina), made a crucial "and one" three point opportunity denied Allan Ray 12 years earlier.

2005–06 season

Led by senior guards Randy Foye and Allan Ray as well as sophomore guard Kyle Lowry, the Villanova men's basketball team began the 2005–2006 year ranked #4 in the major polls from USA Today and the Associated Press. Having lost only three regular season games, the Wildcats enjoyed a #1 seed in the 2006 tournament—their first.
The Wildcats' wins over Monmouth, Arizona, and Boston College brought them back to the Elite Eight for the first time since 1988.  Villanova's 75–62 upset loss in Minneapolis to eventual champion Florida ended the team's run toward a Regional Final.  The loss to Florida was the second consecutive year that Villanova was eliminated in the NCAA tournament by the eventual national champion.  The Wildcats' 28 wins during the 2006 campaign was the second most victories for any Villanova Men's Basketball team at that time.  Foye, Ray and Lowry all entered the NBA following the season.

2006–07 season

Wright's 2006–2007 team was composed mainly of freshmen and sophomores who, at times, struggled to mesh.  The Wildcats improved throughout the season, due in large part to the emergence of freshman Scottie Reynolds.  Villanova finished the 2006–07 season with a record of 22–11.  The Wildcats earned an at-large bid to the 2007 NCAA Tournament, where they lost in the second round to the Kentucky Wildcats.  Villanova's 2006–07 free throw percentage of .781 led the NCAA, and set a Villanova season record.

2007–08 season

The 2007–08 campaign was an erratic one for the young Wildcats, a team with no seniors.  After a promising 9–1 start, Villanova had a rough start to its Big East season.  In mid-season, the Wildcats lost five consecutive games by double digits and lost 6 of 7 games during a 3-week span in the middle of the season, as the freshmen struggled to adjust to the college game, and the experienced players encountered difficulties in adjusting to leadership positions. In February and March, as the players became more comfortable within Coach Wright's system, and with improved defense, the team began to win.

A win against Syracuse in the Big East tournament was good enough for the Wildcats to secure one of the final at-large bids to the NCAA tournament. Villanova proved it was worthy of the bid when an upset over Clemson and a victory over Siena put them in the final 16 teams in the tournament, where they lost to eventual National Champion Kansas.

2008–09 season

Most notable in the 2008–09 season was the rise to prominence of senior forward Dante Cunningham.  Cunningham averaged 16.1 points per game, an increase of nearly 6 points over the previous season.  He also managed to average 7.5 rebounds, 1.2 blocks, and 1.2 steals per game.  Cunningham was honored as the Big East Most Improved Player.  His teammate, tenacious sophomore guard Corey Fisher, was also honored as the Big East Sixth Man of the Year for his contributions off the bench.

The Wildcats finished the regular season with a mark of 26–7, earning a school record for most regular season victories.  They lost their final regular season game to the Louisville Cardinals, 69–55, in the fourth round, or semi-finals of the Big East tournament.  The Wildcats began the NCAA tournament at the Wachovia Center, a secondary venue for home games.  They survived an early scare by American to handily beat two of college basketball's most prestigious programs, UCLA and Duke, in the rounds of 32 and 16 by a combined margin of 43 points.

Villanova won a very close match up against number 1 seed Pittsburgh in the Elite 8 round of the tournament, with guard Scottie Reynolds racing down the court to make a layup with only 0.5 seconds left. Pitt took the final shot, which bounced off the backboard to end the game.  The last-second basket by Reynolds was widely hailed as one of the most exciting plays of that year's tournament, with Sports Illustrated's Seth Davis calling the victory "one of the great games in NCAA tournament history".  Villanova advanced to the Final Four where they faced the North Carolina Tar Heels.  Villanova fell to the Tar Heels in the national semifinals at Ford Field in Detroit, Michigan, by a final score of 83–69. This was the fourth time in five years that Villanova's tournament ouster was by the eventual national champion.

The Wildcats' record of 30–8 broke a previous high for most victories in a season, a distinction previously held by the 2005–06 Wildcats squad.  The senior class of 2009, composed of forwards Dante Cunningham, Shane Clark, Dwayne Anderson and Frank Tchuisi, earned the distinction of being the winningest senior class in school history.

2009–10 season

The Wildcats enjoyed another highly successful regular season, finishing with a record of 24–7 and earning a #2 Seed in the NCAA tournament. They lost in the first round of the Big East tournament to Marquette and required overtime to defeat 15th seeded Robert Morris University in the opening round of the NCAA tournament. The Wildcats were defeated in the 2nd round by the 10th seeded St. Mary's Gaels.

Scottie Reynolds ended his career as the second-leading scorer in Villanova history with 2,222 points, 21 points short of breaking Kerry Kittles's all-time record. He finished his college career with 472 assists and 203 steals. Reynolds was named to the 2010 AP All-American 1st team, but was not selected in the NBA draft.

2016 National Champions

The Wildcats enjoyed another highly successful regular season and held the AP #1 ranking in the nation for the first time in school history over a 3-week period. They finished the regular season with a 27–4 record losing only to teams (Oklahoma, Virginia, Providence, Xavier) that were ranked at the time of the match-up. Villanova finished Big East Conference play 16–2 for the third year in a row also garnering their 3rd straight outright Regular Season Conference Title.
After losing in the Big East tournament championship Game to Seton Hall, 69–67, the Wildcats earned a 2 seed in the NCAA tournament South Region where they dispatched the #15 seeded UNC Asheville by 30 points, followed by a 19-point win over #7 seed Iowa.  After defeating #3 seed Miami by 23, they moved on to the Elite Eight to face the overall #1 seed Kansas Jayhawks.  The Wildcats defense shined as they won by 5 points to advance to their 5th Final Four and the first since 2009.  They faced #2 seed Oklahoma Sooners, who had beaten Villanova by 23 on December 7, 2015, at Pearl Harbor, Hawaii early in the season. In the national semi-Finals, Villanova beat the Sooners by 44 points (an NCAA Final Four record) to advance to the NCAA Championship for the first time in 31 years.  They faced the second-overall #1 seed North Carolina Tar Heels for the championship.
On April 4, Villanova defeated UNC on a game-winning three-point shot at the buzzer by Kris Jenkins to win the NCAA Championship by a final score of 77–74, winning their second NCAA championship.  UNC had recovered from a 10-point deficit in the final five minutes to tie the game on an off-balance, double-clutch three-point shot that passed through the net with 4.7 seconds left, leaving the Wildcats one last chance to clinch a victory before overtime. Kris Jenkins inbounded the ball to four-year team captain Ryan Arcidiacono, who dribbled down court, passed the ball and set a bubble screen to assist Jenkins' game-winning shot.  Coach Jay Wright credits the play to the "Wildcat minute", where the team practices late-game scenarios at every practice.  The game has been called one of the greatest in the history of NCAA tournament championships.

Villanova ended the 2016 season at 35–5 including the unanimous #1 ranking in the final Coaches' Poll (USA Today) while capturing their 2nd NCAA basketball championship trophy in the history of the program. In beating #3 seed Miami (AP #10), #1 seed Kansas (AP #1), #2 seed Oklahoma (AP #7) and #1 seed UNC (AP #3), Villanova became the first school in 31 years — since the 1985 Villanova Wildcats — to not only beat four top-three seeds on the way to a national title but to also beat four straight opponents ranked in the AP top 10, in addition to beating AP-ranked Iowa in the Round of 32.  Villanova's run included two of the ten most offensively efficient games in the analytics era (2002–present), beating Miami and Oklahoma by scoring 1.56 and 1.51 points per possession in the Sweet Sixteen and Final Four, respectively. It has been called perhaps the most dominant tournament championship run of all time, and the most dominant of the analytics era by a wide margin, with Villanova posting an average margin of victory equal to 20.7 points per game (+124 total point margin).

2018 National Champions

The Wildcats finished second in regular season Big East play, won the Big East tournament, and were undefeated in non-conference play. They were awarded the top seed in the East Regional for the NCAA tournament. They reached the Final Four with wins over 16 seed Radford, 9 seed Alabama, 5 seed West Virginia and 3 seed Texas Tech with each victory coming by double-digit margins. In the national semifinals they faced the Kansas Jayhawks, the one seed from the Midwest Region, and defeated them 95–79. In this game Villanova set the new record for successful 3-point attempts in a Final Four game (breaking the previous full-game record before reaching halftime, finishing with 18 total made attempts). In the NCAA tournament championship Game they played the Michigan Wolverines, the 3 seed from the West Region. The Wildcats earned their third national championship in school history by beating the Wolverines 79–62. The game saw a historic performance by Big East Sixth Man of the Year Donte DiVincenzo (31 points, 5 rebounds, 3 assists, 2 steals and 2 blocks), named the 2018 Final Four's Most Outstanding Player. Coach Wright led the team to a 36–4 record for the 2017–18 season (14–4 Big East).  The 36–4 mark sets the record for most wins in any Villanova season. Jalen Brunson received the Wooden Award as well as Associated Press and Naismith National Player of the Year Awards for his season leading the Wildcats. Mikal Bridges was presented the Julius Erving Award as the nation's best small forward—the second straight year a Villanova player achieved that honor after Josh Hart won it in 2017. Jay Wright was named winner of the John R. Wooden Legends of Coaching Award.

Awards and honors

AP Player of the Year
2018 Jalen Brunson

AP Third Team All-Americans
Joe Lord – 1947
Larry Hennessy – 1952,'53
Howard Porter – 1969
John Pinone – 1983
Josh Hart – 2016
Mikal Bridges – 2018
Collin Gillespie - 2022

AP Honorable Mention All-Americans
Bob Schafer – 1954
Hank Siemiontkowski – 1972
Stewart Granger – 1982
John Pinone – 1982
Alvin Williams – 1997
Tim Thomas – 1997
Saddiq Bey – 2020
Collin Gillespie – 2021
Jeremiah Robinson-Earl – 2021

Bob Cousy Point Guard of the Year
2018 Jalen Brunson
2022 Collin Gillespie

Consensus First Team All-Americans
Paul Arizin – 1950
Kerry Kittles – 1996
Randy Foye – 2006
Scottie Reynolds – 2010
Josh Hart – 2017
Jalen Brunson – 2018

Consensus Second Team All-Americans
Howard Porter – 1971
Kerry Kittles – 1995
Michael Bradley – 2001
Allan Ray – 2006

John R. Wooden Player of the Year
2018 Jalen Brunson

John R. Wooden Legends of Coaching
2018 Jay Wright

Julius Erving Small Forward of the Year
2017 Josh Hart
2018 Mikal Bridges
2020 Saddiq Bey

Most Outstanding Player of the NCAA Final Four
1971 Howard Porter
1985 Ed Pinckney
2016 Ryan Arcidiacono
2018 Donte DiVincenzo

McDonald's High School All-Americans
Ed Pinckney – 1981
Harold Pressley – 1982
Barry Bekkedam – 1986
Calvin Byrd & Arron Bain– 1989
Tim Thomas – 1996
Jason Fraser – 2002
Scottie Reynolds – 2006
Corey Stokes – 2007
Dominic Cheek & Maalik Wayns – 2009
JayVaughn Pinkston – 2010
Jalen Brunson – 2015 
Jahvon Quinerly – 2018
Jeremiah Robinson-Earl & Bryan Antoine – 2019

National Freshman of the Year
1997 Tim Thomas

National Coach of the Year
2006 Jay Wright
2016 Jay Wright

Robert V. Geasey Trophy
Hubie White – 1962
Wali Jones – 1963,'64
Bill Melchionni – 1966
Johnny Jones – 1968
Howard Porter – 1969
Chris Ford – 1972
Tom Ingelsby – 1973
John Pinone – 1981,'82,'83
Ed Pinckney – 1985
Harold Pressley – 1986
Kerry Kittles – 1995,'96
Randy Foye – 2006
Scottie Reynolds – 2010
James Bell – 2014
Darrun Hilliard – 2015
Josh Hart – 2017
Jalen Brunson – 2018
Saddiq Bey – 2020

Senior CLASS Award
Josh Hart – 2017

Big East Rookie of the Year
1997 Tim Thomas
2007 Scottie Reynolds
2018 Omari Spellman
2020 Jeremiah Robinson-Earl

Big East Coach of the Year
1982 Rollie Massimino
2006 Jay Wright
2009 Jay Wright
2014 Jay Wright
2015 Jay Wright
2016 Jay Wright
2019 Jay Wright

Big East All-Freshman Selections
1994 Jason Lawson
1997 Tim Thomas
2000 Gary Buchanan
2004 Mike Nardi
2005 Kyle Lowry
2007 Scottie Reynolds
2008 Corey Fisher
2010 Maalik Wayns
2013 Ryan Arcidiacono
2014 Josh Hart
2016 Jalen Brunson
2017 Donte DiVincenzo
2018 Omari Spellman
2019 Saddiq Bey
2020 Justin Moore
2020 Jeremiah Robinson-Earl

Big East Player of the Year
1995 Kerry Kittles
2006 Randy Foye
2015 Ryan Arcidiacono
2017 Josh Hart
2018 Jalen Brunson
2021 Jeremiah Robinson-Earl
2021 Collin Gillespie
2022 Collin Gillespie

Big East Sixth Man of the Year
2009 Corey Fisher
2015 Josh Hart
2018 Donte DiVincenzo

Big East Defensive Player of the Year
1986 Harold Pressley
1988 Gary Massey
1997 Jason Lawson
2017 Mikal Bridges and Josh Hart

Big East Most Improved Player of the Year
2009 Dante Cunningham
2014 Darrun Hilliard and Daniel Ochefu

Postseason

NCAA Tournament history
Villanova has appeared in 40 NCAA Tournaments, beginning with the first in 1939. The Wildcats have amassed a tournament record of 67–38, and were the national champions in 1985, 2016, and 2018. Their three titles are the 8th most of any program.  They have reached the Final Four five times, tied for fifteenth most. Villanova has won as the underdog (based on Tournament seeding) 16 times, more than any other program, and they are the highest seed (8) to ever win the NCAA tournament (1985). Villanova is one of only two programs (the other being Ohio State) that has played in the NCAA tournament in every decade since the 1930s.

NCAA Tournament Seeding History
The NCAA began seeding the tournament with the 1979 edition.

NIT history
The Wildcats have appeared in the National Invitation Tournament (NIT) 18 times. Their combined record is 24–18. They were NIT Champions in 1994.

National Campus Basketball Tournament results
The Wildcats appeared in the only National Campus Basketball Tournament. Their record is 0–1.

Basketball Hall of Fame

Paul Arizin '50, inducted 1978.
Rollie Massimino, coached Villanova to first National Championship in 1985, inducted 2013
Jay Wright, two-time National Championship winning coach, inducted 2021

Individual honors 
Villanova honors outstanding former players, coaches, and others by retiring their numbers or jerseys. For those honored, a replica jersey is hung in the rafters of the Pavilion. Uniform numbers of retired jerseys remain in circulation, while retired numbers are no longer used.  Paul Arizin's #11 is the only retired number. , 21 have been honored with a retired number or jersey, including 16 players, four coaches, and longtime trainer Jake Nevin.

Retired numbers

Retired/honored jerseys 

The honorees include:

Al Severance, Coach.
Jack Kraft, Coach.
Rollie Massimino, Coach (1973–92). Jersey retired in 2005.
 No. 1 Jake Nevin, longtime trainer. Jersey retired in 1984.
 No. 1 Kyle Lowry (2004–2006). Jersey retired in 2020.
 No. 1 Jalen Brunson (2015–2018). Jersey retired in 2022.
 No. 2 Randy Foye (2002–2006). Jersey retired in 2011.
 No. 3 Josh Hart (2013–2017). Jersey retired in 2022.
 No. 11 Paul Arizin (1947–1950). Jersey retired in 1994.
 No. 14 Larry Hennessy (1950–1953).
 No. 14 Allan Ray (2002–2006). Jersey retired in 2019.
 No. 14 Hubie White (1959–1962). Jersey retired in 2001.
 No. 15 Ryan Arcidiacono (2012–2016). Jersey retired in 2020.
 No. 24 Wali Jones (1961–1964). Jersey retired in 1995.
 No. 24 Tom Ingelsby (1970–1973). Jersey retired in 2006.
 No. 25 Bill Melchionni (1963–1966). Jersey retired in 1995.
 No. 25 Bob Schafer (1951–1955).
 No. 30 Kerry Kittles (1992–1996). Jersey retired in 1998.
 No. 33 Keith Herron (1974–1978).
 No. 42 Chris Ford (1969–1972). Jersey retired in 2006.
 No. 45 John Pinone (1979–1983). Jersey retired in 1995.
 No. 50 Jim Washington (1962–1965). Jersey retired in 1995.
 No. 54 Howard Porter (1968–1971). Jersey retired in 2019.
 No. 54 Ed Pinckney (1981–1985)

Villanova career records

All-time leaders

Points

Rebounds

Assists

Steals

Blocks

Wildcats in the NBA/ABA

Villanova's All-Time NBA/ABA roster

Members of professional championship teams
1948 Baltimore Bullets (BBA) – Herman "Red" Klotz 
1956 Philadelphia Warriors (NBA) – Paul Arizin, Larry Hennessy
1967 Philadelphia 76ers (NBA) – Wali Jones, Bill Melchionni
1974/1976 New Jersey Nets (ABA) – Bill Melchionni
1981 Boston Celtics (NBA) – Chris Ford 
2000 Los Angeles Lakers (NBA) – John Celestand
2019 Toronto Raptors (NBA) – Kyle Lowry
2021 Milwaulkee Bucks (NBA) – Donte DiVincenzo

Villanova players currently in the NBA

Villanova players currently in international leagues

 Darrun Hilliard (born 1993), player for Maccabi Tel Aviv of the Israeli Basketball Premier League

Villanova records in the NBA

Villanovans drafted
1958– Round 8, Pick 5: Tom Brennan (Philadelphia Warriors)
1959– Round 7, Pick 3: Joe Ryan (Philadelphia Warriors)
1960– Round 8, Pick 7: George Raveling (Philadelphia Warriors)
1962– Round 2, Pick 7: Hubie White (Philadelphia Warriors)
1963– Round 1, Pick 6: Tom Hoover (Syracuse Nationals)
1964– Round 3, Pick 2: Wali Jones (Detroit Pistons)
1965– Round 1, Pick 5: Jim Washington (St. Louis Hawks)
1965– Round 5, Pick 5: Richie Moore (Philadelphia 76ers)
1966– Round 2, Pick 9: Bill Melchionni (Philadelphia 76ers)
1967– Round 12, Pick 6: Frank Gadjunas (Cincinnati Royals)
1968– Round 16, Pick 8: Joe Crews (Philadelphia 76ers)
1969– Round 6, Pick 13: Johnny Jones (Philadelphia 76ers)
1970– Round 8, Pick 12: Fran O'Hanlon (Philadelphia 76ers)
1971– Round 2, Pick 15: Howard Porter (Chicago Bulls)
1971– Round 9, Pick 7: Clarence Smith (San Francisco Warriors)
1972– Round 2, Pick 4: Chris Ford (Detroit Pistons)
1972– Round 4, Pick 3: Hank Siemiontkowski (Cleveland Cavaliers)
1973– Round 2, Pick 9: Tom Ingelsby (Atlanta Hawks)
1973– Round 11, Pick 9: Ed Hastings (Boston Celtics)
1977– Round 8, Pick 20: John Olive (Philadelphia 76ers)
1978– Round 2, Pick 2: Keith Herron (Portland Trail Blazers)
1980– Round 4, Pick 6: Rory Sparrow (New Jersey Nets)
1981– Round 4, Pick 17: Alex Bradley (New York Knicks)
1981– Round 7, Pick 7: Tom Sienkiewicz (Seattle SuperSonics)
1982– Round 5, Pick 6: Aaron Howard (New York Knicks)
1983– Round 1, Pick 24: Stewart Granger (Cleveland Cavaliers)
1983– Round 3, Pick 11: John Pinone (Atlanta Hawks)
1983– Round 8, Pick 19: Mike Mulquin (Phoenix Suns)
1984– Round 8, Pick 21: Frank Dobbs (Philadelphia 76ers)
1985– Round 1, Pick 10: Ed Pinckney (Phoenix Suns)
1985– Round 2, Pick 3: Dwayne McClain (Indiana Pacers)
1985– Round 7, Pick 15: Gary McLain (New Jersey Nets)
1986– Round 1, Pick 17: Harold Pressley (Sacramento Kings)
1986– Round 6, Pick 14: Chuck Everson (Utah Jazz)
1987– Round 6, Pick 7: Harold Jensen (Cleveland Cavaliers)
1989– Round 2, Pick 11: Doug West (Minnesota Timberwolves)
1996– Round 1, Pick 8: Kerry Kittles (New Jersey Nets)
1997– Round 1, Pick 7: Tim Thomas (New Jersey Nets)
1997– Round 2, Pick 13: Jason Lawson (Denver Nuggets)
1997– Round 2, Pick 19: Alvin Williams (Portland Trail Blazers)
1999– Round 2, Pick 1: John Celestand (Los Angeles Lakers)
2001– Round 1, Pick 17: Michael Bradley (Toronto Raptors)
2006– Round 1, Pick 7: Randy Foye (Boston Celtics)
2006– Round 1, Pick 24: Kyle Lowry (Memphis Grizzlies)
2009– Round 2, Pick 3: Dante Cunningham (Portland Trail Blazers)
2015– Round 2, Pick 8: Darrun Hilliard (Detroit Pistons)
2017– Round 1, Pick 30: Josh Hart (Utah Jazz, traded to Los Angeles Lakers)
2018– Round 1, Pick 10: Mikal Bridges (Philadelphia 76ers, traded to Phoenix Suns)
2018– Round 1, Pick 17: Donte DiVincenzo (Milwaukee Bucks)
2018– Round 1, Pick 30: Omari Spellman (Atlanta Hawks)
2018– Round 2, Pick 3: Jalen Brunson (Dallas Mavericks)
2019– Round 2, Pick 11: Eric Paschall (Golden State Warriors)
2020– Round 1, Pick 19: Saddiq Bey (Detroit Pistons)
2021– Round 2, Pick 2: Jeremiah Robinson-Earl (Oklahoma City Thunder)

Rivals

Big East
Some Villanovans count Georgetown as their most intense rivalry, having played a historic NCAA Championship game and many competitive Big East tournament and regular season games against the Hoyas.  Other rivals from the Big East Conference include founding members of the original Big East—Providence (an eastern rivalry which predates the original Big East) and St. John's, plus Syracuse who left the Big East as part of its 2013 split for the ACC.

Seton Hall has played Villanova more than any other school; due to the proximity of the schools and a series of memorable games since the formation of the new Big East, this has become one of Villanova's top rivalries each season. Games have included critical Seton Hall upsets in 2013, the 2014 Big East tournament, Villanova's first loss of 2015, and the 2016 Big East tournament championship as well as a Villanova blowout in a game that resulted in Seton Hall guard Sterling Gibbs punching Villanova guard Ryan Arcidiacono in 2015 and a narrow victory in the closing seconds of the 2017 Big East tournament semifinals.

Big Five

Villanova along with Saint Joseph's University, La Salle University, Temple University, and University of Pennsylvania banded together to create the Philadelphia Big 5 in 1954–55. From that date until the mid-1970s all Big 5 games were contested at the Palestra (cap. 9,208) on Penn's campus. The Five competed in a round-robin City Series. Additionally, all participated in numerous doubleheaders against non-Big 5 opponents. Most games were televised locally on WPHL-TV, broadcast by Harry Kalas.

Since the beginning of the 1996–1997 season, Villanova has won 15 out of 21 Big 5 titles. They currently have 25 total Big 5 titles which is second most among the participating schools.

Villanova's most bitter Big 5 rival is Saint Joseph's University, in what has become known as the Holy War.

Traditions

Villanova basketball athletes traditionally remain enrolled four years, graduate, and go on to enjoy post-college success. Villanova has never fired a head basketball coach (men's or women's). Villanova has won more NCAA tournament games as a lower seed than any school. Villanova won what has been called the greatest college basketball game ever played, defeating Georgetown 66–64 on April 1, 1985 to win the NCAA national championship.

Songs
V for Villanova is the Wildcats' fight song.  Other Villanova songs include March of the Wildcats.

Streamers
Villanova had a tradition of throwing paper streamers in the school colors of blue and white onto the basketball court at home games, particularly Big Five games, after the first Wildcat basket.  This tradition was shared by other Big Five basketball teams, and at Big Five games, streamers were thrown by both teams following their team's first field goal.  The tradition was stopped in the late 1980s after the NCAA declared that throwing streamers would result in a technical foul. Since then Villanova has restarted the tradition, throwing the streamers on the first basket of the new season during the blue and white scrimmage game during Hoops Mania.

Hoops Mania
Hoops Mania has been an annual tradition to celebrate the start of basketball season. It was originally held in the Jake Nevin Fieldhouse for students and has since grown larger after the success of the 2005–06 season.  It is now held in the Pavilion and is open to the public and students. Following an inter-team scrimmage, notable music artists perform.

References

External links

 

 
1920 establishments in Pennsylvania
Basketball teams established in 1920